Discus catskillensis, common name angular disc, is a species of small air-breathing land snail, a terrestrial gastropod mollusk in the family Discidae, the disk snails.

References

Discidae
Gastropods described in 1896